Grimston Road railway station was a railway station in North Norfolk. It was on the Midland and Great Northern Joint Railway main line, carrying traffic between King's Lynn and the coast. It was not located in Grimston itself, but rather on the road leading into the village.

References

Disused railway stations in Norfolk
Former Midland and Great Northern Joint Railway stations
Railway stations in Great Britain opened in 1879
Railway stations in Great Britain closed in 1959